Monticello (Corsican: U Munticellu) is a commune in the Haute-Corse department of France on the island of Corsica.

History 
The area has been inhabited since the Neolithic period. 

In 1541, Monticello was raided and set aflame by the Barbary pirates led by the Turkish admiral Dragut.

Population

Monuments
Tour de Saleccia
Église Saint-François-Xavier de Monticello

See also
Communes of the Haute-Corse department

References

Communes of Haute-Corse